Sahmir Garčević (born 18 January 1973) is a retired Bosnian football forward.

Club career
He played as forward or attacking midfielder. His playing career include clubs such as FK Budućnost Podgorica, FK Obilić, FK Beograd, FK Željezničar Sarajevo, NK Žepče, FK Baskimi and FK Olimpik Sarajevo.  He played with FK Sutjeska Nikšić in the 1991–92 Yugoslav First League making 3 appearances as substitute.

Honours
Obilić Belgrade
First League of FR Yugoslavia: 1997-98
Željezničar Sarajevo
Premier League of Bosnia and Herzegovina: 2001-02

References

External sources
 
 Obilić 97/98 team with all players profiles at FC Obilic.tripod.com
 Profile at Soccerterminal

1973 births
Living people
Association football forwards
Yugoslav footballers
Bosnia and Herzegovina footballers
FK Sutjeska Nikšić players
FK Budućnost Podgorica players
FK Obilić players
FK Beograd players
FK Željezničar Sarajevo players
NK Žepče players
FK Bashkimi players
FK Olimpik players
Yugoslav First League players
First League of Serbia and Montenegro players
Second League of Serbia and Montenegro players
Premier League of Bosnia and Herzegovina players
Macedonian First Football League players
First League of the Federation of Bosnia and Herzegovina players
Bosnia and Herzegovina expatriate footballers
Expatriate footballers in North Macedonia
Bosnia and Herzegovina expatriate sportspeople in North Macedonia